Hemant Divate is a reputed Marathi poet, editor, translator and publisher based in Mumbai.

Biography 
Hemant Divate is a poet, editor, publisher and translator. He is the founder-editor of the Marathi little magazine Abhidhanantar, which was published without interruption for 15 years. Abhidhanantar has been credited for providing a solid platform to new poets and for enriching the postnineties Marathi literary scene. 

Divate is credited with changing the Marathi literary scene through Abhidhanantar and the Indian English poetry scene through his imprint Poetrywala. He is the author of six poetry collections in Marathi. Divate’s poems have been translated into French, Italian, Slovak, Japanese, Persian, Maltese, Serbian, Slovenian, Greek, Hindi and many Indian languages. In translation, he has a book each in Spanish, Irish, Arabic, German and Estonian apart from four in English. His poems figure in numerous anthologies in Marathi and English. 

The most significant among these are:

 These My Words edited by Eunice de Souza and Melanie Silgardo
 The Red Hen Anthology of Indian, poetry edited by Ravi Shankar and Sampurna Chattarji
 100 Great Poems in Indian languages from the Last 3000 Years edited by Abhay K Kumar, and Kavita Antologija Sodobne 
 Indijske Poezije (Anthology of Indian Poetry in Slovenian translation) edited by Evald Flisar and K Satchidanandan.

Divate has participated in numerous international poetry and literature festivals across the globe. His publishing house, Paperwall Media & Publishing, has published (under its imprint Poetrywala) more than 100 poetry collections. Hemant lives and works in Mumbai.

Bibliography 

 Chautishi Paryentchya Kavita
 Virus Alert. translated by Dilip Chitre.
 Thambtach Yet Nahi
 Poems of Les Murray ( translated into Marathi)
 Ya Roommadhe Aale Ki Life Suru Hote
 A Depressingly Monotonous Landscape translated by Sarabjeet Garcha
 Alarma De Virus translation of Virus Alert into Spanish by Zingonia Zingone
 Foláireamh Víris translation of Virus Alert into Gaelic/Irish by Gabriel Rosenstock
 "Zingonia Zingonechya Kavita" translated from Spanish/English into Marathi
 "Reloaded" Selected poems in Marathi original (1990-2015) published by Poetrywala
 "Selected Poems: 1990-2015" in English Translation published by Poetrywala
 "Man without a Navel" Selected Translations edited by Mustansir Dalvi published by Poetrywala (An imprint of Paperwall Media & Publishing Pvt. Ltd.) available at (http://www.paperwall.in)

Poetry
Mohak
When the Wife Isn't Home
The Fragrance Your Body Would Give
And Here too He gets screwed

Online References 
Poetry International Web
at MuseIndia
at Kala Ghoda Festival
an Interview with Hemant Divate at New Quest
Hemant Divate's interview at Mumbai Mirror

1967 births
Marathi-language poets
Living people
Writers from Mumbai
20th-century Indian translators
Poets from Maharashtra